Andrew Findlay (1899 – 1976) was a Scottish footballer who played as a right back, primarily for St Mirren. 

Joining the Paisley club after serving in the Royal Navy during World War I, over seven seasons he made 246 appearances in major competitions (without scoring) and was in the team which won the Scottish Cup in 1926. He was offered a benefit match against a 'Scottish Select' in 1928, but by the following year he had lost his place to understudy Walter Hay, and moved on to Dundee United for a short spell.

References

1899 births
1976 deaths
Date of birth missing
Date of death missing
Scottish footballers
English footballers
Footballers from Greater Manchester
People from Audenshaw
Footballers from Fife
St Mirren F.C. players
Dundee United F.C. players
Armadale F.C. players
Scottish Junior Football Association players
Scottish Football League players
Association football defenders
Anglo-Scots
Rosslyn Juniors F.C. players
Royal Navy personnel of World War I
Military personnel from Fife